FDA or Food and Drug Administration, is an agency responsible for the control and safety of food and drugs.

FDA may also refer to:

Law
 Flag Desecration Amendment, a proposed amendment to the United States Constitution
 Food and Drugs Act, in Canada

Science and technology
 Forensic data analysis
 Fully differential amplifier
 Functional data analysis, a branch of statistics
 Fluorescein diacetate, a non-fluorescent substrate; see fluorescein diacetate hydrolysis

Other uses 
 FDA (trade union), a British trade union
 Angolan Democratic Forum, a former political party
 Faisalabad Development Authority, in Pakistan
 Florida Dental Association, in the United States
 Front Deutscher Äpfel, a German parody movement
 Fuji Dream Airlines, a Japanese airline
 Ferrari Driver Academy, a program by Scuderia Ferrari to promote young talents

See also 
Food and Drug Administration (disambiguation)